Fabio Depaoli (born 24 April 1997) is an Italian professional footballer who plays as a midfielder for  club Hellas Verona, on loan from Sampdoria.

Club career

ChievoVerona
Depaoli made his professional debut in the Serie A for Chievo on 12 March 2017 in a game against Empoli as an 89th-minute substitute for Përparim Hetemaj in a 4–0 victory.

Sampdoria
On 22 June 2019, Depaoli signed a contract with Sampdoria until 30 June 2024.

Loan to Atalanta
On 2 October 2020, Depaoli joined Atalanta on loan with an option to buy.

Loan to Benevento
On 26 January 2020, Depaoli's loan to Atalanta was terminated early; he joined Benevento on loan with an option to buy for the remainder of the 2020–21 season.

Loans to Verona
On 3 January 2022, he joined Hellas Verona on loan until the end of the 2021–22 season, with an option to purchase. After beginning the 2022–23 season in Sampdoria rotation and starting one game against Salernitana, on 1 September 2022 Depaoli returned to Hellas Verona on a new loan, with an option to purchase.

International career
Depaoli made his debut with the U21 team on 5 October 2017, scoring one goal in a 6–2 friendly win against Hungary in Budapest.

Career statistics

References

External links
 

Living people
1997 births
People from Riva del Garda
Association football midfielders
Italian footballers
Italy under-21 international footballers
A.C. ChievoVerona players
U.C. Sampdoria players
Atalanta B.C. players
Benevento Calcio players
Hellas Verona F.C. players
Serie A players
Sportspeople from Trentino
Footballers from Trentino-Alto Adige/Südtirol